The Chambers Street station was a station on the demolished IRT Sixth Avenue Line in Manhattan, New York City. It had two tracks and two side platforms. It was served by trains from the IRT Sixth Avenue Line and opened on June 5, 1878. It closed on December 4, 1938. The next southbound stop was Park Place. The next northbound stop was Franklin Street. The Chambers Street – World Trade Center / Park Place station complex can be found within the vicinity of the former elevated railroad station.

References

External links
 NYCsubway.org - IRT 6th Avenue Elevated, Chambers Street

IRT Sixth Avenue Line stations
Railway stations in the United States opened in 1878
Railway stations closed in 1938
Former elevated and subway stations in Manhattan
1878 establishments in New York (state)
1938 disestablishments in New York (state)